The 1912 Oregon Webfoots football team represented the University of Oregon in the 1912 college football season. The team was led by head coach Louis Pinkham, in his first year, and played their home games at Kincaid Field in Eugene, Oregon. They finished the season with a record of 3–4.

Schedule

References

Oregon
Oregon Ducks football seasons
Oregon Webfoots football